Rafhael Lucas Oliveira da Silva (born 30 November 1992), known as Rafhael Lucas, is a Brazilian footballer who plays for Vila Nova as a forward.

Club career
Born in Curitiba, Paraná, Rafhael Lucas joined Coritiba's youth setup in 2002, as a central defender. He made his senior debut while on loan for São Carlos in 2012.

Rafhael Lucas was subsequently loaned to Arapongas, scoring two goals in five matches. On February 14, 2014, he joined Atlético Sorocaba, also in a temporary deal.

On September 29, 2014, Rafhael was promoted to Coritiba's main squad, along with fellow youth graduate Walisson. He was the club's top goalscorer in 2015 Campeonato Paranaense, netting 12 goals in 14 matches.

Rafhael Lucas made his Série A debut on May 9, 2015, starting and scoring the first goal in a 1–2 away loss against Chapecoense; it was also the first goal of the tournament. He appeared in 24 matches during the campaign, as his side avoided relegation.

On December 31, 2015, Rafhael Lucas moved to Goiás, recently relegated to Série B. On October 26, 2016, Rafhael Lucas moved to Fortaleza, then recently relegated to Série C.

References

External links
Coritiba profile 

1992 births
Living people
Footballers from Curitiba
Brazilian footballers
Brazilian expatriate footballers
Association football forwards
Campeonato Brasileiro Série A players
Campeonato Brasileiro Série B players
Campeonato Brasileiro Série C players
Campeonato Brasileiro Série D players
Categoría Primera A players
Coritiba Foot Ball Club players
São Carlos Futebol Clube players
Clube Atlético Sorocaba players
Goiás Esporte Clube players
Mirassol Futebol Clube players
Fortaleza Esporte Clube players
Paraná Clube players
Esporte Clube Internacional de Lages players
Jaguares de Córdoba footballers
Associação Atlética Anapolina players
Esporte Clube Santo André players
Vila Nova Futebol Clube players
Brazilian expatriate sportspeople in Colombia
Expatriate footballers in Colombia